The Women's Shot Put event at the 2005 World Championships in Athletics was held at the Helsinki Olympic Stadium on August 12 and August 13. The event was won by Nadzeya Ostapchuk of Belarus but when samples taken from her during those games were retested in 2013, they revealed she had been doping.

After revision, Olga Ryabinkina from Russia and Valerie Vili from New Zealand were promoted to gold and silver respectively. The bronze medal was awarded to Nadine Kleinert from Germany who originally finished fifth since all the results of the fourth-placer Svetlana Krivelyova of Russia between August 18, 2004, and August 17, 2006, were annulled in a separate doping case.

Medalists

Schedule
All times are Eastern European Time (UTC+2)

Abbreviations
All results shown are in metres

Records

Qualification

Group A

Group B

Final

See also
 2005 Shot Put Year Ranking

References

IAAF results, heats
IAAF results, final
 todor66

Shot Put
Shot put at the World Athletics Championships
2005 in women's athletics